Lockesporte, also spelled Lockesport or Lockport and originally known as Lock's Harbour, was a fishing village and logging community on the eastern coast of Seal Bay, within the much larger Notre Dame Bay, Newfoundland, Canada.

Lockesporte first appeared in census records in 1869 (as Lock's Harbour), at which point it was recorded as having 34 inhabitants, though this likely included the residents of neighbouring Winter House Cove. The population fell to a low of 15 in 1911, before rebounding to 74 in 1951. In the late 1960s, both it and Winter House Cove were resettled, with 39 Lockesporte residents moving to Glovers Harbour and the remainder to Leading Tickles, Point Leamington, and Deer Lake.

See also
 List of ghost towns in Newfoundland and Labrador

Notes

References

Ghost towns in Newfoundland and Labrador
1960s disestablishments in Newfoundland and Labrador
Populated places disestablished in the 1960s